Tritrichomonas is a genus of single celled flagellated parasitic excavates, some of whose species are known to be pathogens of the bovine reproductive tract as well as the intestinal tract of felines.

Species
Example species within the genus Tritrichomonas are T. augusta and T. foetus, the latter of which characteristically interacts with bacteria that reside in the intestinal tract by adhering to the intestinal epithelium of the host. T. augusta have been observed in the rough-skinned newt, Taricha granulosa, in certain northern California coastal counties in the United States.

References
 K. Hausmann, N. Hülsmann and R. Radek (2003) Protistology  3rd completely revised edition, E. Schweizerbart’sche Verlagsbuchhandlung.  Stuttgart, Germany.
 C. Michael Hogan (2008) Rough-skinned Newt (Taricha granulosa), Globaltwitcher, ed. Nicklas Stromberg

Line notes

Flagellates
Excavata genera